The female reproductive system is made up of the internal and external sex organs that function in the reproduction of new offspring. In humans, the female reproductive system is immature at birth and develops to maturity at puberty to be able to produce gametes, and to carry a fetus to full term. The internal sex organs are the vagina, uterus, fallopian tubes, and ovaries. The female reproductive tract includes the vagina, uterus, and fallopian tubes and is prone to infections. The vagina allows for sexual intercourse and childbirth, and is connected to the uterus at the cervix.  The uterus or womb accommodates the embryo which develops into the fetus. The uterus also produces secretions which help the transit of sperm to the fallopian tubes, where sperm fertilize ova (egg cells) produced by the ovaries. The external sex organs are also known as the genitals and these are the organs of the vulva including the labia, clitoris, and vaginal opening.

During the menstrual cycle, the ovaries release an ovum, which transits through the fallopian tube into the uterus. If an egg cell meets with sperm on its way to the uterus, a single sperm cell can enter and merge with it, fertilizing it into a zygote.

Fertilization usually occurs in the fallopian tubes and marks the beginning of embryogenesis. The zygote will then divide over enough generations of cells to form a blastocyst, which implants itself in the wall of the uterus. This begins the period of gestation and the embryo will continue to develop until full-term. When the fetus has developed enough to survive outside the uterus, the cervix dilates and contractions of the uterus propel the newborn through the birth canal (the vagina).

The corresponding equivalent among males is the male reproductive system.

External organs
The female external reproductive organs are the secondary sex organs that are visible externally.

Vulva

The vulva consists of all of the external parts and tissues and includes the mons pubis, pudendal cleft, labia majora, labia minora, Bartholin's glands, Skene's glands, clitoris, urethra, and vaginal opening.

Internal organs

The female internal reproductive organs are the vagina, uterus, Fallopian tubes, and ovaries.

Vagina

The vagina is a fibromuscular (made up of fibrous and muscular tissue) canal leading from the outside of the body to the cervix of the uterus or womb. It is also referred to as the birth canal in the context of pregnancy. The vagina accommodates the male penis during sexual intercourse. Semen containing spermatozoa is ejaculated from the male at orgasm, into the vagina potentially enabling fertilization of the egg cell (ovum) to take place.

Cervix

The cervix is the neck of the uterus, the lower, narrow portion where it joins with the upper part of the vagina. It is cylindrical or conical in shape and protrudes through the upper anterior vaginal wall. Approximately half its length is visible, the remainder lies above the vagina beyond view. The vagina has a thick layer outside and it is the opening where the fetus emerges during delivery.

Uterus

The uterus or womb is the major female reproductive organ. The uterus provides mechanical protection, nutritional support, and waste removal for the developing embryo (weeks 1 to 8) and fetus (from week 9 until the delivery). In addition, contractions in the muscular wall of the uterus are important in pushing out the fetus at the time of birth.

The uterus contains three suspensory ligaments that help stabilize the position of the uterus and limits its range of movement. The uterosacral ligaments keep the body from moving inferiorly and anteriorly. The round ligaments restrict posterior movement of the uterus. The cardinal ligaments also prevent the inferior movement of the uterus.

The uterus is a pear-shaped muscular organ. Its major function is to accept a fertilized ovum which becomes implanted into the endometrium, and derives nourishment from blood vessels which develop exclusively for this purpose. The fertilized ovum becomes an embryo, develops into a fetus and gestates until childbirth. If the egg does not embed in the wall of the uterus, a female begins menstruation.

Fallopian tube

The Fallopian tubes are two tubes leading from the ovaries into the uterus. On maturity of an ovum, the follicle and the ovary's wall rupture, allowing the ovum to escape and enter the Fallopian tube. There it travels toward the uterus, pushed along by movements of cilia on the inner lining of the tubes. This trip takes hours or days.  If the ovum is fertilized while in the Fallopian tube, then it normally implants in the endometrium when it reaches the uterus, which signals the beginning of pregnancy.

Ovaries

The ovaries are small, paired organs located near the lateral walls of the pelvic cavity. These organs are responsible for the production of the egg cells (ova) and the secretion of hormones.  The process by which the egg cell (ovum) is released is called ovulation. The speed of ovulation is periodic and impacts directly to the length of a menstrual cycle.

After ovulation, the egg cell is captured by the Fallopian tube, after traveling down the Fallopian tube to the uterus, occasionally being fertilized on its way by an incoming sperm. During fertilization the egg cell plays a role; it releases certain molecules that are essential to guiding the sperm and allows the surface of the egg to attach to the sperm's surface. The egg can then absorb the sperm and fertilization can then begin.

Function
The female reproductive system functions to reproduce offspring.

In the absence of fertilization, the ovum will eventually traverse the entire reproductive tract from the fallopian tube until exiting the vagina through menstruation.

The reproductive tract can be used for various transluminal procedures such as fertiloscopy, intrauterine insemination, and transluminal sterilization.

Development

Chromosome characteristics determine the genetic sex of a fetus at conception. This is specifically based on the 23rd pair of chromosomes that is inherited. Since the mother's egg contains an X chromosome and the father's sperm contains either an X or Y chromosome, it is the male who determines the fetus's sex. If the fetus inherits the X chromosome from the father, the fetus will be a female. In this case, testosterone is not made and the Wolffian duct will degrade thus, the Müllerian duct will develop into female sex organs. The clitoris is the remnants of the Wolffian duct. On the other hand, if the fetus inherits the Y chromosome from the father, the fetus will be a male. The presence of testosterone will stimulate the Wolffian duct which will bring about the development of the male sex organs and the Müllerian duct will degrade.

Clinical significance

Vaginitis 
Vaginitis is inflammation of the vagina and largely caused by an infection. It is the most common gynaecological condition presented. It is difficult to determine any one organism most responsible for vaginitis because it varies from range of age, sexual activity, and method of microbial identification. Vaginitis is not necessarily caused by a sexually transmitted infection as there are many infectious agents that make use of the close proximity to mucous membranes and secretions. Vaginitis is usually diagnosed based on the presence of vaginal discharge, which can have a certain color, odor, or quality.

Bacterial vaginosis 

This is a vaginal infection in women. It differs from vaginitis in that there is no inflammation. Bacterial vaginosis is polymicrobial, consisting of many bacteria species. The diagnosis for bacterial vaginosis is made if three of the following four criteria are present: (1) Homogenous, thin discharge, (2) a pH of 4.5 in the vagina, (3) epithelial cells in the vagina with bacteria attached to them, or (4) a fishy odor. It has been associated with an increased risk of other genital tract infections such as endometritis.

Yeast infection 

This is a common cause of vaginal irritation and according to the Centers for Disease Control and Prevention at least 75% of adult women have experienced one at least once in their lifetime. Yeast infections are caused by an overgrowth of fungus in the vagina known as Candida. Yeast infections are usually caused by an imbalance of the pH in the vagina, which is usually acidic. Other factors such as pregnancy, diabetes, weakened immune systems, tight fitting clothing, or douching can also be a cause. Symptoms of yeast infections include itching, burning, irritation, and a white cottage-cheese-like discharge from the vagina. Women have also reported that they experience painful intercourse and urination as well. Taking a sample of the vaginal secretions and placing them under a microscope for evidence of yeast can diagnose a yeast infection. Treatment varies from creams that can be applied in or around the vaginal area to oral tablets that stop the growth of fungus.

Genital mutilation

There are many practices of mutilating female genitalia in different cultures. The most common two types of genital mutilation practiced are clitoridectomy, the circumcision of the clitoris and the excision of the prepuce the skin around the clitoris. They can all involve a range of adverse health consequences such as bleeding, irreparable tissue damage, and sepsis which can sometimes prove fatal.

Genital surgery

Genitoplasty refers to surgery that is carried out to repair damaged sex organs particularly following cancer and its treatment.
There are also elective surgical procedures which change the appearance of the external genitals.

Birth control

There are many types of birth control available to females.  Birth control can be hormonal or physical in nature.  Oral contraception can assist with management of various medical conditions, such as menorrhagia.  However, oral contraceptives can have a variety of side effects, including depression.

Reproductive rights

The International Federation of Gynaecology and Obstetrics was founded in 1954 to promote the well-being of women particularly in raising the standards of gynaecological practice and care. As of 2010 there were 124 countries involved.

Reproductive rights are legal rights related to reproduction and reproductive health. Women have the right to control matters involving their sexuality including their sexual and reproductive health. Violation of these rights include forced pregnancy, forced sterilization, forced abortion and genital mutilation. Female genital mutilation is the complete or partial removal of a female's external genitals.

History
It is claimed in the Hippocratic writings that both males and females contribute their seed to conception; otherwise, children would not resemble either or both of their parents. Four-hundred years later, Galen "identified" the source of 'female semen' as the ovaries in female reproductive organs.

See also
 Conception
 Development of the reproductive system
 Evolution of sexual reproduction
 Female infertility
 Oogenesis

References

External links 

 Female reproductive system 
 Interactive diagram of female reproductive system